The Gideon H. Pond House is a historic house in Bloomington, Minnesota, United States.  It is part of the Pond-Dakota Mission Park, which also includes the Oak Grove Mission site (1843–1852), a cemetery, and the remains of the Pond family farm and orchards. The site is significant within the history of the Minnesota River valley, the Dakota tribe, and Bloomington.  The house is listed on the National Register of Historic Places.

Gideon Hollister Pond (1810–1878) and his brother Samuel came to Minnesota with a mission to teach Christianity to the Indians and to teach them agriculture. The Ponds received permission in 1834 from Major Lawrence Taliaferro, the Indian agent at Fort Snelling, to establish a mission school near Bde Maka Ska (Lake Calhoun), where a band of Dakota spent their summers. Pond started work on writing a Dakota language dictionary. After a war broke out between the Dakota and the Ojibwa in 1839, the band of Dakota moved to a village near the Minnesota River, and Gideon Pond moved with them. He established a mission along the river bluffs. The area served as a mission between 1843 and 1852, when the Dakota were sent to a reservation further up the Minnesota River as a result of the Treaty of Traverse des Sioux.  At that point, Pond bought this land and became a farmer. He also served as a member of Minnesota territorial House of Representatives 7th District, 1849–1850.  Later, Pond started the Oak Grove Presbyterian Church, which was originally located on land which is now the Bloomington Cemetery. The church later moved its building to the corner of Penn Avenue and Old Shakopee Road.

The home, located at 401 East 104th Street in Bloomington, is constructed of red brick and features chimneys serving each room. The home was occupied by Gideon and his wife Sarah, and is now open to the public on a limited basis.

References

External links

 Pond-Dakota Mission Park and Gideon Pond House - official site
 The pond brothers, Minnesota Historical Society, THEODORE C. BLEGEN, 1934

Buildings and structures in Bloomington, Minnesota
Houses completed in 1856
Federal architecture in Minnesota
Historic house museums in Minnesota
Houses in Hennepin County, Minnesota
Houses on the National Register of Historic Places in Minnesota
Museums in Hennepin County, Minnesota
National Register of Historic Places in Hennepin County, Minnesota